Hibbert Henry "Hib" Milks (April 1, 1899 – January 21, 1949) was a Canadian professional ice hockey forward who played eight seasons in the National Hockey League with the Pittsburgh Pirates, Philadelphia Quakers, New York Rangers and Ottawa Senators between 1925 and 1933.

Playing career
Milks recorded 87 goals and 41 assists for 128 points in 317 career regular season NHL games. The majority of his career was spent with the Pittsburgh Pirates. He died in 1949 at the age of 49. Milks was the only captain of the Philadelphia Quakers, a team whose NHL history consists of just one season (1930–31).

Career statistics

Regular season and playoffs

Awards and achievements
OCHL Second All-Star Team (1922)

External links

1899 births
1949 deaths
Anglophone Quebec people
Canadian ice hockey centres
Ice hockey people from Quebec
New York Rangers players
Ottawa Senators (original) players
People from Outaouais
Philadelphia Quakers (NHL) players
Pittsburgh Pirates (NHL) players
Pittsburgh Yellow Jackets (USAHA) players